The Peerless was a British car made by Peerless Cars Ltd. of Slough, Berkshire, between 1957 and 1960, when the company failed. The company was resurrected by one of the original founders, Bernie Rodger, as Bernard Roger Developments BRD Ltd and marketed as the Warwick from a base in Colnbrook, Buckinghamshire, between 1960 and 1962.

Peerless
The prototype of this British-built sports saloon, which was alloy bodied and initially named the Warwick, was designed by Bernie Rodger for company founders John Gordon and James Byrnes.

The car had been renamed the Peerless GT by the time series production started in 1957. It featured Triumph TR3 running gear in a tubular space frame with de Dion tube rear suspension clothed in attractive fibreglass 4-seater bodywork. While the car had good performance it was expensive to produce and the overall fit and finish was not as good as that of similarly priced models from mainstream manufacturers. The Phase II version had an improved body largely moulded in one piece.

About 325 were made.

A works car was entered in the 1958 24 Hours of Le Mans, finishing 16th.

Production ceased in 1960 after about 325 examples had been produced.

Warwick

Bernie Rodger restarted production of the car as the Warwick, a much-improved version of the original Peerless GT car with minor cosmetic changes such as a one-piece forward-hinged front end, a stiffer space-frame chassis and a revised dashboard. Although it was produced from 1960–1962, only about 40 cars are thought to have been built.

The test car cost £1666 including taxes.

Two prototypes of a successor car, the 3.5 Litre or GT350, were made in 1961 and featured the light alloy Buick V8 engine that was later taken up by Rover.

John Gordon, together with Jim Keeble (who had previously inserted a Buick V-8 engine into a Peerless), subsequently used the Peerless space-frame as the basis for a Chevrolet-powered car with Giugiaro-designed, Bertone-built bodywork, initially shown in 1960 as the Gordon GT, and which eventually reached production in 1964 as the Gordon-Keeble.

See also
 List of car manufacturers of the United Kingdom

References

External links
The Peerless and Warwick Owners Register (Great Britain)
Peerless and Warwick history from the Gordon Keeble club

Defunct motor vehicle manufacturers of England
Cars of England
Cars introduced in 1957
Sports car manufacturers
24 Hours of Le Mans teams